Paul Seevers (born 1969) is a hurler from County Sligo, Ireland. He played with the Sligo county team from more than 20 years. He helped the Sligo team to a National Hurling League Division 3 victory in 2004, scoring 2–07 in the final and won a Nicky Rackard Cup in 2008 when Sligo overcame favourites Louth in the final in Croke Park by 3–19 to 3–10, he scored 1–04 in that game and 2–30 over the course of the championship. He also won 3 Railway Cup medals with Connacht. He plays with the Tubbercurry club in Sligo. He represented Ireland in the Shinty International against Scotland in 2003. He won 10 Sligo Senior Hurling Championships winning 9 in a row from 1995 to 2004 and once again in 2006. He also won a Sligo Senior Football Championship in 1991.

References

1969 births
Living people
Dual players
Sligo inter-county hurlers
Tubbercurry hurlers
Tubbercurry Gaelic footballers